No. 3 Group (3 Gp) of the Royal Air Force was an RAF group first active in 1918, again in 1923–26, part of RAF Bomber Command from 1936 to 1967, and part of RAF Strike Command from 2000 until it disbanded on 1 April 2006.

No. 3 Group was first formed on 10 May 1918 as part of South-Eastern Area. No. 13 Group RAF was merged into 3 Group on 18 October 1919. Group Captain U J D Bourke took command on 30 November 1919. The Group was disbanded on 31 August 1921.

The 1930s and the Second World War
Reformed in 1923, 3 Group was disbanded on 12 April 1926 at RAF Spitalgate by renumbering it No. 23 (Training) Group.

The Group was reformed at Andover, Wiltshire on 1 May 1936, under Air Vice-Marshal Patrick Playfair. Ten months later Group HQ moved to RAF Mildenhall in Suffolk, a direct result of the Air Ministry's decision to form two new bomber groups and reorganise its existing groups. No. 3 Group was initially equipped with the ungainly Vickers Virginia and Handley Page Heyford, which was the RAF's last biplane heavy bomber.

With the arrival of the then revolutionary twin engined Vickers Wellington it was decided that No. 3 Group would be tasked with introducing the type into front line service. The first squadron in Bomber Command to be equipped was No. 99 Squadron RAF based at Mildenhall, on 10 October 1938. Air Commodore A A B Thomson, Playfair's successor, was killed on 8 August 1939 while viewing the bombing up of a Vickers Wellington of No. 115 Squadron RAF. While under the fuselage, he slipped and was struck on the head by the rotating airscrew. Air Vice-Marshal J E A Baldwin took over the Group on 29 August 1939. By September 1939 the entire group (totalling six front line squadrons and two reserve squadrons) was fully equipped with an all-Wellington force totalling over 100 aircraft located at five East Anglian airfields. 3 Group continued to be primarily based in East Anglia for the rest of WWII. 3 Group's first wartime operations were attacks against German warships at Wilhelmshaven and Brunsbüttel.

Group HQ moved to Harraton House, Exning, Suffolk, in March 1940. On 2 April 1940, two squadrons were temporarily transferred to RAF Coastal Command and advanced bases in Northern Scotland, and they had hardly settled in before the Germans invaded Denmark and Norway. The squadrons went into action immediately and on 11/12 April one of them (115 Sqn) became the first RAF unit to bomb deliberately a mainland target (Stavanger Airport, Sola) during the Second World War. In September 1940 3 Group Bomber Command assumed administrative control of No. 419 Flight, the first of the Royal Air Force Special Duties Service units. The group provided administrative support for all the Special Duties squadrons til the end of the war.

In 1942 the Group’s strength was almost halved when 7, 156, and 109 Squadrons were transferred to the newly created No. 8 Group – the Pathfinder Force.

In March 1943 3 Group consisted of:

3 Group Headquarters – Harraton House, Exning, Suffolk.
15 Sqn, RAF Bourn, Short Stirling
75 Sqn, RAF Newmarket, Stirling
90 Sqn, RAF Ridgewell, Stirling
115 Sqn, RAF East Wretham, Wellington & Lancaster 	
138 (Special Duties) Squadron, RAF Tempsford, Halifax
149 Sqn, RAF Lakenheath, Stirling
199 Sqn, RAF Lakenheath, Stirling
161 (Special Duties) Squadron, RAF Tempsford, Lysander, Halifax Hudson Havoc Albemarle Hudson Cygnet 	
192 (Special Duties) Squadron, RAF Gransden Lodge, Halifax, Wellington Mk.X Mosquito Wellington Mk.IC 	
214 Sqn, RAF Chedburgh, Stirling
218 Sqn, RAF Downham Market, Stirling

After the invasion of Normandy, Bomber Command joined in the campaign against German oil targets. Although daylight bombing against targets within Germany itself still incurred too many casualties closer targets could be attacked by day with fighter escorts. 3 Group carried out blind bombing techniques by day using G-H.

By April 1945 3 Group consisted of:
15 Sqn, RAF Bourn, Avro Lancaster Mks. I and III
75 Sqn, RAF Mepal, Lancaster Mks. I and III
90 Sqn, RAF Tuddenham, Lancaster Mks. I and III
115 Sqn, RAF Witchford, Lancaster Mks. I and III 	
138 (Special Duties) Squadron, RAF Tuddenham, Lancaster Mks. I and III
149 Sqn, RAF Methwold, Lancaster Mks. I and III
186 Sqn, RAF Stradishall, Lancaster Mks. I and III
195 Sqn, RAF Wratting Common, Lancaster Mks. I and III
218 Sqn, RAF Chedburgh, Lancaster Mks. I and III
514 Sqn, RAF Waterbeach, Lancaster Mks. I, II and III
622 Sqn, RAF Mildenhall, Lancaster Mks. I and III
Training units, e.g. No. 1688 Flight, at RAF Feltwell
Headquarters – Exning

Post war
The Group HQ moved back to Mildenhall in January 1947. In June 1948, No.3 Group consisted of 35, 115, 149, and 207 Squadrons operating Lancasters from RAF Stradishall, Nos 7, 49, 148, and 214 Squadrons operating Lancasters from RAF Upwood, and 15, 44, 90, 138 Squadrons operating Lincolns from RAF Wyton. For a period in the early 1950s several squadrons flew Boeing Washingtons, the British name for Boeing B-29 Superfortresses lent to the UK until the English Electric Canberra could enter service. Most of the Vickers Valiant and Handley Page Victor, squadrons, made operational in the late 1950s, formed part of No. 3 Group. During the Suez Crisis of 1956 Valiants of 138, 148, 207 and 214 Squadrons were deployed to RAF Luqa in Malta and the first Valiant attacks against Egyptian airfields began on 31 October 1956, with limited results due to the lack of experience operating the Valiant.

No. 3 Group was also responsible for the Thor ballistic missile between 1 September 1958 and August 1963, with ten squadrons, including Nos:- 
77 Headquartered at RAF Feltwell
82 Headquartered at RAF Shepherds Grove
107 Headquartered at RAF Tuddenham
113 Headquartered at RAF Mepal
130 Headquartered at RAF Polebrook
144 Headquartered at RAF North Luffenham
218 Headquartered at RAF Harrington
220 Headquartered at RAF North Pickenham
223 Headquartered at RAF Folkingham
254 Headquartered at RAF Melton Mowbray

each with three missiles, being equipped with the weapon. On 1 November 1967 the Group was absorbed by No. 1 (Bomber) Group RAF.

The Group was reformed on 1 April 2000 to control Joint Force Harrier and maritime aircraft transferred from the former No. 11/18 Group RAF.  It came under a Royal Navy officer, the Flag Officer Maritime Aviation. Rear Admiral Iain Henderson was the first occupant of the post, who also had the NATO roles of COMAIREASTLANT and COMMARAIRNORTH. AOC 3 Group/FOMA had two RAF subordinates, Air Commodore Harrier (for all the RAF Harriers and FAA Sea Harriers) and Air Commodore Maritime (for the Nimrods and SAR helicopters). After a further reorganisation in 2003-4, the group became known as the Battle Management Group and controlled the Airborne Early Warning aircraft, ground-based radar installations, maritime reconnaissance aircraft and the search and rescue helicopters in the UK.  The group was based alongside Strike Command at RAF High Wycombe, Buckinghamshire.

In 2006 the Group consisted of:

3 Gp Headquarters – RAF High Wycombe
 RAF Bentley Priory 	
 RAF Boulmer 	
 RAF Fylingdales 	
 RAF Neatishead 	
 5 Sqn, RAF Waddington
 8 Sqn, RAF Waddington
 22 Sqn, A Flight & HQ, RMB Chivenor 	
 22 Sqn, B Flt, RAF Wattisham 	
 22 Sqn, C Flt, RAF Valley 	
 23 Sqn, RAF Waddington
 42(R) Sqn Squadron, RAF Kinloss 	
 51 Sqn, RAF Waddington
 120 Sqn Squadron, RAF Kinloss
 201 Sqn Squadron, RAF Kinloss
 202 Sqn, A Flt & HQ, RAF Boulmer 	
 202 Sqn, D Flt, RAF Lossiemouth
 202 Sqn, E Flt, RAF Leconfield
 SARF / 203(R) Sqn Squadron, RAF St. Mawgan (disbanded from April 2009)	

As from 1 April 2006, the stations and squadrons which were under the command of 3 Group RAF were brought under the command of No. 2 Group RAF.

Commanders
1919 to 1921
30 November 1919 Group Captain U J D Bourke
23 November 1920 Group Captain A M Longmore

1923 to 1926
16 April 1923 Air Commodore T I Webb-Bowen
7 March 1924 Air Commodore L E O Charlton
2 January 1925 Air Commodore R Gordon
1 October 1925 Air Commodore I M Bonham-Carter

1936 to 1967
1 May 1936 Air Vice-Marshal P H L Playfair
14 February 1938 Air Commodore A A B Thomson (killed on duty 8 August 1939)
29 August 1939 Air Vice-Marshal J E A Baldwin
14 September 1942 Air Vice-Marshal The Hon R A Cochrane
27 February 1943 Air Vice-Marshal R Harrison
28 February 1946 Air Vice-Marshal A C Collier
Post vacant
9 July 1946 Air Vice-Marshal R M Foster
18 March 1947 Air Vice-Marshal L Darvall
14 December 1948 Air Vice-Marshal A Hesketh
15 September 1951 Air Vice-Marshal W A D Brook
1 September 1953 Air Vice-Marshal E C Hudleston
2 February 1956 Air Vice-Marshal K B B Cross
4 May 1959 Air Vice-Marshal M H Dwyer
9 October 1961 Air Vice-Marshal B K Burnett
5 August 1964 Air Vice-Marshal D F Spotswood
26 November 1965 Air Vice-Marshal D G Smallwood

2000 to present
 1 April 2000 Rear-Admiral Iain R Henderson (Royal Navy – Fleet Air Arm)
 24 July 2001 Rear-Admiral Scott Lidbetter (Royal Navy – Fleet Air Arm)
 7 October 2003 Air Vice-Marshal A D White

See also
 List of Royal Air Force groups

References

Citations

Bibliography

 Moyes, Philip J.R. Bomber Squadrons of the RAF and their Aircraft. London: Macdonald and Jane's (Publishers) Ltd., 2nd edition 1976. .
 Ward, Chris. 3 Group Bomber Command: An Operational Record. Barnsley, UK: Pen and Sword Books Ltd.,2008. .
 Webster, Charles and Noble Frankland, The Strategic Air Offensive Against Germany, 1939–1945 (HMSO, 1961 & facsimile reprinted by Naval & Military Press, 2006), 4 vols. .

External links
 Air of Authority – A History of RAF Organisation – Group No's 1 – 9
 Story of No 3 Group

003
Bomber aircraft units and formations of the Royal Air Force
Military units and formations established in 1918
Military units and formations disestablished in 2006
1918 establishments in the United Kingdom